South Franklin may refer to:
 South Franklin, Maine
 South Franklin Township, Washington County, Pennsylvania